Andrew Eliot (1718–1778) was a prominent Boston Congregational minister of the New North Church (now St. Stephen's in the North End). He graduated from Harvard University in 1737 and received his AM from the same institution in 1740. During the Siege of Boston in the American Revolutionary War, he was one of the few ministers to remain in Boston. Eliot had an extensive collection of New England silver coins.

Eliot's father, grandfather and great-grandfather were all named Andrew. He had five sons: Reverend Andrew Eliot was a minister in Fairfield, Connecticut, Josiah Eliot was said to have gone to Georgia, Samuel Eliot was a merchant and the grandfather of Reverend William Greenleaf Eliot, Reverend John Eliot succeeded his father as pastor of New North Church and was one of the co-founders of the Massachusetts Historical Society and Dr. Ephraim Eliot studied medicine at Harvard University but became an apothecary and the first president of the Massachusetts College of Pharmacy.

See also 
Eliot family of America

References

External links 

1718 births
1778 deaths
People from colonial Boston
American Congregationalist ministers
Harvard University alumni
Massachusetts colonial-era clergy